This is a complete list of weapons deployed on Japanese combat aircraft during the Second World War.

Army aircraft

Machine guns
Type 89 7.7 mm machine gun (copy of Vickers Class E)
Ho-103 12.7 mm machine gun (based on Browning M1921)

Cannons

Mauser MG 151/20 20 mm cannon
Ho-1 20 mm cannon
Ho-3 20 mm cannon
Ho-5 20 mm cannon (based on Browning)
Ho-155 cannon (aka Ho-105) 30 mm cannon (based on Browning)
 Ho-155-II 30mm cannon
Ho-203 37 mm cannon
Ho-204 37 mm cannon (based on Browning)
Ho-301 40 mm cannon (caseless ammunition, sometimes considered a "rocket launcher")
Ho-401 57 mm cannon 
Ho-402 57 mm cannon
Type 88 75 mm cannon

Bombs
The Japanese army used a number of different types of bombs during World War II, ranging from 15 to 500 kilograms.

Rear armament (for defensive use)

Type 89 7.7 mm machine gun (based on Type 11)
Type 98 7.92 mm machine gun (copy of MG 15)
Ho-104 12.7 mm machine gun (based on Browning M1921)

Combat head (for special use)

Combat head of 800 kg
Combat head of 2,900 kg
Combat head of 6,393 lbs (thermite bomb)

Navy aircraft

Machine guns
Type 92 7.7 mm machine gun (British Lewis)
Type 97 7.7 mm machine gun (Vickers)
Type 3 13.2 mm machine gun (Browning with Hotchkiss 13.2mm cartridge)

Cannons
Type 99 cannon 20 mm cannon (Oerlikon FF)
Type 2 30 mm cannon
Type 5 30 mm cannon

Rear armament (for defensive use)

Type 92 7.7 mm machine gun (British Lewis)
Type 1 7.92 mm machine gun (German MG 15)
Type 2 13 mm machine gun (German MG 131)
Type 99-1/Type 99-2 20 mm cannon (Oerlikon FF)

Bombs

References

Notes

Bibliography

See also
 List of Japanese military equipment of World War II
 List of weapons of military aircraft of Germany during World War II

Aircraft